Radio Brod or Радио Брод is a Bosnian local public radio station, broadcasting from Bosanski Brod, Bosnia and Herzegovina.

The program is mainly produced in Serbian from 7 am to 6 pm. The estimated number of potential listeners of Radio Brod is around 33,924. Radiostation is also available in neighboring Croatia.

Frequencies
 Bosanski Brod/Brod

See also 
List of radio stations in Bosnia and Herzegovina

References

External links 
 www.fmscan.org
 Communications Regulatory Agency of Bosnia and Herzegovina

Bosanski Brod
Brod, Bosnia and Herzegovina